Mitraria is a genus of flowering plants in the family Gesneriaceae, comprising the sole species Mitraria coccinea (Chilean mitre flower).

It is a woody climbing plant, native of the temperate rain forests of Chile. The very attractive scarlet-orange tubular flowers are borne in late spring and summer.

External links
"Mitraria coccinea" en Enciclopedia de la flora Chilena
Mitraria coccinea from Paghat Garden
Mitraria coccinea from Chilebosque

Gesnerioideae
Flora of Chile
Gesneriaceae genera
Monotypic Lamiales genera
Taxa named by Antonio José Cavanilles